The pumpkinseed (Lepomis gibbosus), also referred to as pond perch, common sunfish, punkie, sunfish, sunny, and kivver, is a small/medium-sized North American freshwater fish of the genus Lepomis (true sunfishes), from family Centrarchidae (sunfishes, crappies and black basses) in the order Perciformes.

Distribution and habitat
The pumpkinseed's natural range in North America is from New Brunswick down the east coast to South Carolina.  It then runs inland to the middle of North America, and extends through Iowa and back through Pennsylvania.
Pumpkinseed sunfish have however been introduced throughout most of North America. They can now be found from Washington and Oregon on the Pacific Coast to Georgia on the Atlantic Coast. Yet they are primarily found in the northeastern United States and more rarely in the south-central or southwestern region of the continent.

In Europe, the pumpkinseed is considered an invasive species. They were introduced to European waters, and could outcompete native fish. This species is included since 2019 in the list of Invasive Alien Species of Union concern (the Union list). This implies that this species cannot be imported, bred, transported, commercialized, or intentionally released into the environment in the whole of the European Union.

Description

They are orange, green, yellow or blue in color, with speckles over their sides and back and a yellow-orange breast and belly, and the coloration of the ctenoid scales of the pumpkinseed is one of the most vibrant of any freshwater fish and can range from an olive-green or brown to bright orange and blue. The sides are covered with vertical bars that are a faint green or blue, which are typically more prevalent in female pumpkinseeds. Orange spots may cover the dorsal, anal, and caudal fins and the cheeks have blue lines across them. The pumpkinseed is noted for the orange-red spot on the margin of its black gill cover. The pectoral fins of a pumpkinseed can be amber or clear, while the dorsal spines are black. They have a small mouth with an upper jaw stopping right under the eye.

Pumpkinseeds are very similar to the larger bluegill, and are often found in the same habitats.  One difference between the two species is their opercular flap, which is black in both species but the pumpkinseed has a crimson spot in the shape of a half moon on the back portion. Pumpkinseeds have seven or eight vertical, irregular bands on their sides that are duller in color compared to the bluegill.

Habitat
Pumpkinseeds typically live in warm, calm lakes, ponds, and pools of creeks and small rivers with plenty of vegetation.  They prefer clear water where they can find shelter to hide.  They tend to stay near the shore and can be found in numbers within shallow and protected areas.  They will feed at all water levels from the surface to the bottom in the daylight, and their heaviest feeding will be in the afternoon.  Pumpkinseed sunfish usually travel together in schools that can also include bluegills and other sunfish.

Pumpkinseeds are more tolerant of low oxygen levels than bluegills are, but less tolerant of warm water. Groups of young fish school close to shore, but adults tend to travel in groups of two to four in slightly deeper yet still covered waters. Pumpkinseeds are active throughout the day, but they rest at night near the bottom or in shelter areas in rocks or near submerged logs.

Dietary habits
Pumpkinseeds are carnivorous and feed on a variety of small prey both at the water surface and at the bottom.  Among their favorites are insects, small molluscs and crustaceans (such as small crawfish), worms, minnow fry, small frogs or tadpoles, and even cannibalizing other smaller pumpkinseeds. They are effective at destroying mosquito larvae and even occasionally consume small pieces of aquatic vegetation and detritus.

The pumpkinseed sunfish has a terminal mouth, allowing it to open at the anterior end of the snout. Pumpkinseed sunfish that live in waters with larger gastropods have larger mouths and associated jaw muscles to crack the shells.

Sport fishing
The pumpkinseed sunfish are typically very likely to bite on a worm bait, which makes them easy to catch while angling.  Many fishermen consider the pumpkinseed to be a nuisance fish, as it bites so easily and frequently when the fisherman is attempting to catch something else.  The pumpkinseeds are very popular with young fishermen due to their willingness to bite, their abundance and close locations to the shore.  Although many people consider the meat of a pumpkinseed to be good-tasting, it is typically not a popular sport fish due to its small size.

Because pumpkinseeds tend to remain in the shallows and feed all day, pumpkinseeds are relatively easy to catch via bank fishing. They will bite at most bait – including garden worms, insects, leeches, or bits of fish meat. They will also take small lures and can be fished for with a fly rod with wet or dry flies. They will also hit at grubs early in the winter, but are less active from mid- to late winter. They may be easy to catch and popular with the youngest anglers, but pumpkinseeds are often sought by adults as well. The fish do put up an aggressive fight on line, and they have an excellent flavor and are low in fat and high in protein.

Conservation status
The pumpkinseed sunfish is very common and is not listed by CITES. It is considered Least Concern (not threatened) by the IUCN. Spawning grounds of the pumpkinseeds can be disturbed by shoreline development and shoreline erosion from heavy lake use.  Their susceptibility to silt and pollution makes the pumpkinseed a good indicator of the cleanliness and health of water.

Reproduction and life cycle
Once water temperatures reach  in the late spring or early summer, the male pumpkinseeds will begin to build nests.  Nesting sites are typically in shallow water on sand or gravel lake bottoms.  The males will use their caudal fins to sweep out shallow, oval-shaped nesting holes that stretch about twice the length of the pumpkinseed itself.  The fish will remove debris and large rocks from their nests with their mouths.

Nests are arranged in colonies consisting of about three to 15 nests each.  Often, pumpkinseeds build their nests near bluegill colonies, and the two species interbreed.  Male pumpkinseeds are vigorous and aggressive, and defend their nests by spreading their opercula.  Because of this aggressive behavior, pumpkinseeds tend to maintain larger territories than bluegills.

Females arrive after the nests are completed, coming in from deeper waters. The male then releases milt and the female releases eggs. Females may spawn in more than one nest, and more than one female may use the same nest. Also, more than one female will spawn with a male in one nest simultaneously. Females are able produce 1,500 to 1,700 eggs, depending on their size and age.

Once released, the eggs stick to gravel, sand, or other debris in the nest, and they hatch in as few as three days. Females leave the nest immediately after spawning, but males remain and guard their offspring. The male guards them for about the first 11 days, returning them to the nest in his mouth if they stray from the nesting site.

Sexual maturity is usually achieved by age two. Pumpkinseeds have lived to be 12 years old in captivity, but in nature most do not exceed six to eight years old.

Adaptations

The pumpkinseed sunfish has adapted in many ways to the surroundings where it lives. Its skin reflects camouflage for its habitat. The pattern that appears on the pumpkinseed resembles that of the sunlight patterns that reflect on the shallow water of bays and river beds.

The pumpkinseed sunfish has developed a specific method of protection. Along the dorsal fin are 10 to 11 spines, and three additional spines on the anal fin. These spines are very sharp, which aid the fish in defense. The pumpkinseed has the ability to anticipate approaching predators (or prey) via a lateral line system, allowing it to detect changes or movements in the water using different mechanical receptors.

The brightly colored gill plates of the pumpkinseed sunfish also serve as a method of protection and dominance. Also known as an eye spot, the dark patch at the posterior of the gill plate provides the illusion that the eye of the fish is larger and positioned further back on the body, thus making the fish seem up to four times larger than it actually is. When a pumpkinseed feels threatened by a predator, it flares its gills to make it seem larger in size, and shows off the flashy red coloration. Males of the species also flare their gills in the spring spawning season in a show of dominance and territoriality.

In the southernmost regions of its distribution, the pumpkinseed has developed a larger mouth opening and abnormally large jaw muscles to aid in feeding; its forage is small crustaceans and mollusks.  The larger bite radius and enhanced jaw muscles allow the pumpkinseed to crack the shells of their prey to attain the soft flesh within, thus providing one common name of 'shellcracker'.

Etymology
Lepomis, in Greek, means 'scaled gill cover' and gibbosus means 'humped'.  The defining characteristic of a pumpkinseed sunfish is the bright red spot at the tip of the ear flap. The pumpkinseed sunfish is widely recognized by its shape of a pumpkin seed, from which its common name comes.

References

Fish described in 1758
Fish of the Great Lakes
Fish of the United States
Freshwater fish of North America
Lepomis
Taxa named by Carl Linnaeus
Freshwater fish of the United States
Invasive animal species in Europe
Invasive species in Ukraine